Thomas Watson (13 October 1896 — 17 May 1974) was a Scottish first-class cricketer.

Watson was born at Larkhall in October 1896 and was educated at Uddingston Grammar School. A club cricketer for Uddingston, he made his debut in first-class cricket for Scotland against Ireland at Edinburgh in 1928. A further appearance against Ireland followed at Dublin in 1929, before three first-class matches against touring international sides: the South Africans in 1929, the Australians in 1930, and the New Zealanders in 1931. Playing as a right-arm fast-medium bowler in the Scottish side, he took 13 wickets in his five matches at an average of 22.92, with best figures of 3 for 54. Watson died in May 1974 at Stonehouse, South Lanarkshire.

References

External links
 

1896 births
1974 deaths
Sportspeople from Larkhall
People educated at Uddingston Grammar School
Scottish cricketers